The Patna–Gaya line is a railway line connecting Patna on the Howrah–Delhi main line and Gaya on the Howrah–Gaya–Delhi line both in the Indian state of Bihar.

History
Gaya was connected to Patna in 1900 by East Indian Railway Company.

Electrification
The Gaya–Jahanabad sector was electrified in 2002–2003.   Electrification of the Patna–Gaya line was completed in 2003.

Passenger movement
Patna and Gaya, on this line, are amongst the top hundred booking stations of Indian Railway.

Railway reorganisation
In 1952, Eastern Railway,  Northern Railway and North Eastern Railway were formed. Eastern Railway was formed with a portion of East Indian Railway Company, east of Mughalsarai and Bengal Nagpur Railway. Northern Railway was formed with a portion of East Indian Railway Company west of Mughalsarai, Jodhpur Railway, Bikaner Railway and Eastern Punjab Railway. North Eastern Railway was formed with Oudh and Tirhut Railway, Assam Railway and a portion of Bombay, Baroda and Central India Railway. East Central Railway was created in 1996–97.

See also 
 Patna–Digha Ghat line

References

External links
Trains at Patna Junction
Trains at Jehanabad
Trains at Gaya

|

5 ft 6 in gauge railways in India
Railway lines in Bihar

Railway lines opened in 1900

1900 establishments in India
Transport in Gaya, India